"Checkpoint" is episode 12 of season 5 of the television show Buffy the Vampire Slayer.

Plot

The Scooby Gang gathers at Buffy's house to discuss the Watchers' Council's plans to come to Sunnydale, which Buffy is very upset about. She recalls that her two previous experiences with the Council put her life in mortal peril, and wishes that they would just give her the information she needs without making the trip to Sunnydale. (Buffy has met Quentin Travers only once before, in "Helpless", but met other Council members in "Who Are You".)

Glory is at her place, panting and in obvious pain. Dreg and another demon rush into the room, bringing a hysterical mailman. They carry her to the crying man and help her put her fingers to his temples to drain away his sanity. She gets up, refreshed, and the disoriented mailman wanders away. The other demon warns her that she has even less time now to use the key, but Glory is not worried, expressing pride that she will eliminate Buffy as the only obstacle between her and the key. Jinx confronts Ben at the hospital and relays a message from Glory, who wants Ben's assistance in gathering useful information about the Slayer. Ben responds by beating up the demon.

Quentin Travers and a large team of Watchers arrive at the Magic Box. They disrupt business, sending paying customers home, and criticize Giles' selection of merchandise. They announce that the Magic Box will be closed for the duration of the Council's stay in Sunnydale. Giles is frustrated and takes an antagonistic position, and then learns that the Council plans on conducting an extensive review of Buffy's methods, skills, and abilities. Quentin announces that they have information on Glory, but will not reveal it until Buffy's skills have been comprehensively tested and she proves she can handle the information; if she fails, the shop will be closed permanently and Giles will be deported. Buffy and Giles realize that they must cooperate with the Council, which is powerful enough to carry out all its threats. Buffy worries that she may fail, placing everyone in even greater danger.

Council members interview the rest of the Scooby Gang, including Spike, for information about the Slayer. Lydia interviews Spike, and she reveals she wrote her thesis on him. With the exception of Spike, who notes Buffy's failure at long-term relationships, they all try not to incriminate Buffy in any way, and each tries to justify their usefulness to her without making it sound like she actually needs help. In the training room, Buffy is blindfolded and her fighting skills are tested against one of the council members. She breaks a rib of her opponent and Quentin abandons that test.

Upon returning home, Buffy finds Glory in her living room. During this confrontation, Glory openly threatens to kill all of Buffy's friends and family and force Buffy to watch her do so. Visibly disturbed by this, Buffy takes Dawn and Joyce to Spike for protection. Although Spike initially protests the sudden increase of "manly responsibilities", he agrees to look after them; after a moment's awkwardness, Joyce and Spike discover their shared addiction to Passions and sit down to watch it together.

On her way to the shop to meet with the council for a comprehensive review of her plans and strategies, three well-armed men wearing medieval fighting gear attack Buffy. Buffy takes them out and discovers from the last conscious one that they are the Knights of Byzantium and are in town to destroy the Key. They consider her their enemy because she protects the Key.

Buffy returns to the shop and informs Travers that she is not going to deal with the review anymore. She now knows that she holds power against both Glory and the Council because they both need something from her: Glory needs to know where the Key is, and the Council needs her to make their jobs meaningful. She delivers an authoritative speech justifying the participation of each of her friends, and demands that Giles be reinstated as her Watcher, receiving retroactive pay from the month of his dismissal. She finally instructs the Council to give her the information that she needs. Quentin reluctantly agrees to her terms. He then informs Buffy that Glory is not a demon – she is a god.

Reception 
Noel Murray of The A.V. Club wrote that Checkpoint was a "highly entertaining episode" with "narrative and thematic significance," adding, "The real fight that Buffy has been staging for five years now may not be between good and evil, but between hidebound traditionalism and ingenious innovation, and between elitism and democratization... What better symbol for the degraded state of The Old Ways than a mad god in stylish clothes, sucking the brains of postmen and walking right into the Summers house and staring straight at Dawn — the object she seeks — while remaining completely ignorant."

Reviewer Mikelangelo Marinaro wrote for the Critically Touched Reviews website that this "wonderfully pleasant episode" is "Buffy's first serious take on the subject of power, which of course is a major theme of S7." Marinaro discusses how "Checkpoint stays focused on Buffy and how she takes another fine step into adulthood while discovering more about her power as a Slayer which, of course, is a big theme of the season." The reviewer gave the episode grades of 90/100 and A−.

A. M. Dellamonica, writing a recap for the Tor Books website, concludes, "Though [this is] not a primarily comic episode, the Scooby interviews are chucklesome. And even though, in dramatic terms, this confrontation has superficial similarities to the one between the Scoobies and the Maclays in Family, I can't help but love that sense of a bill coming due. The Watchers have been needing comeuppance. That they get it direct from the sacrificial teen they've been happy to think of as 'their instrument' only makes it sweeter."

References

External links

 
 "Checkpoint" at BuffyGuide.com

Buffy the Vampire Slayer (season 5) episodes
2001 American television episodes
Television episodes written by Jane Espenson